Harvey Fillingane (born December 11, 1938) is an American Republican politician. From 2008 to 2012 he served as member of the Mississippi House of Representatives from the 101st District. He was first elected in 2007.

References

1938 births
Living people
People from Lamar County, Mississippi
Republican Party members of the Mississippi House of Representatives
21st-century American politicians